Stein 2051 (Gliese 169.1, G 175-034, LHS 26/27) is a nearby binary star system, containing a red dwarf (component A) and a degenerate star (white dwarf) (component B), located in constellation Camelopardalis at about 18 ly from Earth.

Stein 2051 is the nearest (red dwarf + white dwarf) separate binary system (40 Eridani BC is located closer at 16.26 light-years, but it is a part of a triple star system).

Stein 2051 B is the 6th nearest white dwarf after Sirius B, Procyon B, van Maanen's star, LP 145-141 and 40 Eridani B.

Properties
The brighter of this two stars is A (a red dwarf), but the more massive is component B (a white dwarf).

In 2017, Stein 2051 B was observed passing in front of a more distant star. The bending of starlight by the gravitational field of the nearer star allowed its mass to be directly measured.

References

External links
 (the whole system)
 (component A)
 (component B)

Camelopardalis (constellation)
Binary stars
M-type main-sequence stars
White dwarfs
0169.1
J04311147+5858375
WISE objects
021088